KF Liria Zagraçan – Shum (FK Lirija Zagrachani - Shum) is a football club based in the village of Zagraçan near Struga, North Macedonia. They are currently competing in the Macedonian Third League (Southwest Division).

History
The club was founded in 1979.

References

External links
Liria Zagračani Facebook 
Club info at MacedonianFootball 
Football Federation of Macedonia 

Liria Zagračani
Association football clubs established in 1979
1979 establishments in the Socialist Republic of Macedonia
FK
Liria Zagrachani